Antonie "Toni" Stárová (born 12 October 1998) is a Czech footballer who plays as a midfielder for Sparta Prague and has appeared for the Czech Republic women's national team.

Career
Stárová has been capped for the Czech Republic national team, appearing for the team during the 2019 FIFA Women's World Cup qualifying cycle.

References

External links
 
 
 

1998 births
Living people
People from Nymburk District
Czech women's footballers
Czech Republic women's international footballers
Women's association football midfielders
AC Sparta Praha (women) players
Expatriate women's soccer players in the United States
NC State Wolfpack women's soccer players
Czech expatriate sportspeople in the United States
Czech Women's First League players
Delaware Fightin' Blue Hens women's soccer players
Sportspeople from the Central Bohemian Region
Czech expatriate women's footballers